Kotzebue Sound is an arm of the Chukchi Sea in the western region of the U.S. state of Alaska. It is on the north side of the Seward Peninsula and bounded on the east by the Baldwin Peninsula.

Kotzebue Sound is located in the transitional climate zone, which is characterized by long, cold winters and cool summers. Kotzebue Sound is ice-free from early July until early October.

The towns of Kotzebue, Kiwalik and Deering are on the shores of Kotzebue Sound. Kotzebue Sound was explored and named in 1816 by Baltic German Lieutenant Otto von Kotzebue while searching for the Northeast Passage in the service of Russia.

Fauna
A wide variety of birdlife is apparent at Kotzebue Sound including the tufted puffin, black-throated diver and red-throated loon.

The sound is a location for the presence of the polar bear, Ursus maritimus; in fact, the world's record largest polar bear at 2,210 pounds (1,002 kg) was observed at Kotzebue Sound in 1960.

Notes

References
 Giddings, J. Louis, and Douglas D. Anderson. Beach Ridge Archeology of Cape Krusenstern Eskimo and Pre-Eskimo Settlements Around Kotzebue Sound, Alaska. Washington DC: National Park Service, U.S. Dept. of the Interior, 1986. 
 Lucier, Charles V., and James W. VanStone. Traditional Beluga Drives of the Iñupiat of Kotzebue Sound, Alaska. Fieldiana, new ser., no. 25. Chicago: Field Museum of Natural History, 1995.

External links
 Robert L. Dey Typescript and Correspondence on a Trip to Kotzebue Sound at Dartmouth College Library

Sounds of Alaska
Bodies of water of Northwest Arctic Borough, Alaska
Bodies of water of the Chukchi Sea